Halleck is an unincorporated community in Buchanan County, in the U.S. state of Missouri.

History
A post office called Halleck was established in 1862, and remained in operation until 1902. The community was named in honor of Henry Halleck, a U.S. Army officer.

References

Unincorporated communities in Buchanan County, Missouri
Unincorporated communities in Missouri